The Aircore Cadet is an American ultralight aircraft that was designed by Jim Scott and produced by Aircore Industries in the early 1980s. The aircraft was supplied as a kit for amateur construction.

Design and development
It features a strut-braced high-wing, single-seat, open cockpit, single tractor engine configuration, and is equipped with tricycle landing gear.

The aircraft is made from bolted together aluminum tubing, with the wings and tail covered in Dacron sailcloth. Its  span wing employs "V" lift struts and jury struts. The aircraft keel is an aluminum tube that runs from the tail, mounts the wings and the engine at its forward end. The standard factory-supplied engine is the  Rotax 277, driving a  diameter fixed-pitch propeller with a  pitch. The pilot sits on an open seat without a windshield. The control system is conventional three-axis, with half-span ailerons. The main landing gear is sprung steel and the nosewheel incorporates steering. There is a small tail caster to protect the tail. Brakes are optionally available.

Reviewer Andre Cliche describes the Cadet as "a clean and simple design that is inexpensive to maintain."

Specifications (Cadet)

References

External links
Photo of an Aircore Cadet

1980s United States ultralight aircraft
Homebuilt aircraft
Single-engined tractor aircraft